Cyanothamnus inconspicuus is a plant in the citrus family, Rutaceae and is endemic to the south-west of Western Australia. It is a shrub with pinnate leaves and small white or creamy green flowers with four petals and eight stamens and occurs from the Stirling Range to Mount Ragged.

Description
The eight stamens have a few hairs and the stigma is small. Flowering mainly occurs from September to December.

Taxonomy and naming
This species was first formally described in 1863 by George Bentham who gave it the name Boronia inconspicua in Flora Australiensis from a specimen collected by James Drummond. In a 2013 paper in the journal Taxon, Marco Duretto and others changed the name to Cyanothamnus inconspicuus on the basis of cladistic analysis. The specific epithet (inconspicuus) is Latin word meaning "not readily visible" or "not prominent".

Distribution and habitat
This boronia usually grows on rocky outcrops and is found from the Stirling Range to Mount Ragged in the Esperance Plains and Mallee biogeographic regions.

Conservation
Cyanothamnus inconspicuus is classified as "not threatened" by the Western Australian Government Department of Parks and Wildlife.

References

inconspicuus
Flora of Western Australia
Plants described in 1863
Taxa named by George Bentham